Grimmen is a town in Vorpommern-Rügen, a district in the Bundesland Mecklenburg-Vorpommern, Germany. Prior to 2011, when district reforms were made in Mecklenburg-Vorpommern, it was the capital of the now bygone Nordvorpommern district, which was abolished and merged to create the district of Vorpommern-Rügen.

Geography

Grimmen is located in southeastern Nordvorpommern on the banks of the river Trebel, about 30 km south of Stralsund and 30 km west of Greifswald. The town is connected to the Stralsund- Neustrelitz-Berlin railways, and to Autobahn A 20. Adjacent to the city limits are Amt Franzburg-Richtenberg in the West, Amt Miltzow in the North, and the Süderholz municipality in the Southeast.

Villages within Grimmen's city limits

In addition to the town of Grimmen, the following villages are also within Grimmen's city limits:

 Appelshof
 Gerlachsruh
 Grellenberg
 Groß Lehmhagen
 Heidebrink
 Hohenwarth
 Hohenwieden
 Jessin
 Klein Lehmhagen
 Stoltenhagen
 Vietlipp

Neighbouring municipalities

Neighbouring municipalities, listed clockwise beginning in the North, are Wittenhagen, Wilmshagen, Süderholz, Wendisch Baggendorf, Splietsdorf, Papenhagen.

History

Grimmen was founded during the Ostsiedlung, when about 1250 merchants and craftsman from Lower Saxony, Westphalia and the Lower Rhine settled the site which then was part of the Principality of Rügen. The first document mentioning Grimmens is of 1267. In 1287, a report mentions Vogt Berthold taking office in the town, and further mentions that Grimmen had already been granted Lübeck law before. The actual charter is lost, thus the exact date when the town received Lübeck law remains uncertain. Accordingly, the 700th anniversary was celebrated in 1987. Since 1325, Grimmen belonged to the Duchy of Pomerania.

During the Thirty Years' War, the town was looted several times. After the war, Grimmen became part of Swedish Pomerania, a dominion of the Swedish Empire. From 1695 to 1697, mayor Johannes Flittner cruelly pursued alleged witches; at least seven were executed. In 1797, a large fire destroyed almost the entire town. In 1800, Swedish king Gustav IV Adolph visited Grimmen and resided in the so-called king's house. Following the Congress of Vienna in 1815, Swedish Pomerania with Grimmen became part of the Prussian Province of Pomerania. An administrative reform of 1816 made the town capital of a Kreis. In 1853, cholera broke out.

At the end Second World War, Grimmen surrendered to the Red Army without fighting in April 1945. In the 1960s, numerous new factories and agricultural enterprises were set up, resulting in prosperity and physical growth of the city. After East Germany's Communist regime collapsed following Die Wende movement of 1989, the town's old buildings were reconstructed. After a reorganization of the Kreis districts in 1994, Grimmen became capital of newly created Vorpommern-Rügen.

Demography
1600 – approx. 1,000 inhabitants
1712 – approx. 850 inhabitants
1809 – 1,840 inhabitants
1900 – 3,616 inhabitants
1946 – 8,298 inhabitants
1986 – approx. 15,000 inhabitants
1990 – of 14,242 inhabitants
1993 – 13,376 inhabitants
2003 – 10,892 inhabitants
2004 – 11,201 inhabitants

Twin towns – sister cities

Grimmen is twinned with:
 Châteaulin, France
 Czaplinek, Poland

 Osterholz-Scharmbeck, Germany
 Staffanstorp, Sweden

Sights

Buildings
The oldest building of the town is St. Mary's church, built in 1267. Of the old fortifications, three Brick Gothic gates are still intact:
 Mühlentor ("mill gate", built ~1320)
 Stralsunder Tor ("Stralsund gate", built ~1320)
 Greifswalder Tor ("Greifswald gate", built between 1350 and 1400).
Further sights are the city hall, built in Brick Gothic style around the year 1400, and the water tower, built in 1933.

Zoo
Grimmen's zoo holds more than 250 animals of 50 different kinds. The zoo opened in 1957 and also has a large variety in plants and green areas.

Notable people
Gottlieb Mohnike (1781–1841), pastor, philologist and translator
Heike Götz (born 1964), journalist

In Fiction

The first chapters of Denis Wheatley's WWII spy thriller "They used dark forces" are set in 1944 Grimmen, where Wheatley's British  agent Gregory Sallust arrives on a secret mission in Nazi Germany.

References

External links

Grimmen.de - official website (German)

Populated places established in the 13th century
1287 establishments in Europe